Georgi Emilyevich Yungvald-Khilkevich (22 October 1934 – 11 November 2015) was a Soviet and Russian film director, screenwriter, producer, actor, theatre director and set designer. Most famous for his musicals and Alexandre Dumas adaptations. He directed 22 motion pictures and TV films between 1966 and 2009. Honored Artist of the Russian SFSR (1990) and Ukraine (1995).

Biography
Georgi Yungvald-Khilkevich was born into a theatrical family of noble heritage. His mother Nina Ivanovna Buiko was a ballet dancer. His maternal grandfather Ivan Petrovich Buiko came from an old Russian family and served as a colonel in the Imperial Russian Army and a commandant in Warsaw. He joined Bolsheviks in 1917. Georgi's father Emil Iosifovich Yungvald-Khilkevich was an acclaimed theater director and one of the founders of the Uzbek National Theater of Opera and Ballet (later Navoi Theater). His paternal grandfather came from Polish szlachta and owned railroads in Western Ukraine, while his wife Elena Cavalieri was an Italian; she was said to be the sister of the famous opera singer Lina Cavalieri who was very popular in the Russian Empire and regularly visited Kyiv with concerts.

Georgi Yungvald-Khilkevich graduated from the Ostrovsky Tashkent Theatrical Institute in 1963. He worked as a set designer at Tashkent theaters and film studios. In 1966 he finished directing and screenwriting Mosfilm courses and started working at the Odessa Film Studio, where he later directed most of his movies.

His first major breakthrough happened in 1969 with the musical film Dangerous Tour loosely based on the memoirs of Alexandra Kollontai. The screenplay was written with Vladimir Vysotsky in mind, who eventually played the main part, wrote all the songs and did some uncredited contribution to the final draft. His partners were Nikolai Grinko, Yefim Kopelyan, Ivan Pereverzev and Georgi Yumatov. The film became one of the leaders of the Soviet box office in 1970 (9th place).

In 1978 Khilkevich turned to Alexandre Dumas who happened to be one of his favourite writers since childhood. His 3-part made-for-TV adventure musical D'Artagnan and Three Musketeers was an ultimate success, with many songs and catchphrases becoming part of the popular culture. It was followed by three sequels in 1992, 1993 and 2009. In 1988 he made another Dumas adaptation – The Prisoner of Château d'If based on The Count of Monte Cristo novel. The screenplay was co-written by Mark Zakharov, while all the songs were written and performed by Alexander Gradsky.

Among his other notable works was another musical Ah, Vaudeville, Vaudeville... and a comedy The Art of Living in Odessa based on The Odessa Tales by Isaac Babel. He rarely turned to cinema during the post-Soviet years. In 1997 he joined Yuri Kuklachev at the National Cats Theater in Moscow as a stage director and scriptwriter. He also worked as a set designer in various theaters. His last film in the Musketeer series directed in 2007 and screened in 2009 was met with harsh critique and became a box office bomb.

Yungvald-Khilkevich died from the heart failure at the age of 81. He was buried at the Troyekurovskoye Cemetery in Moscow. He was survived by his third wife, an actress Nadira Mirzaeva (born 1969), and two daughters — Natalia (born 1960) and Nina (born 1997).

Selected filmography

Bibliography
Georgi Yungvald-Khilkevich, Natalia Yungvald-Khilkevich. За кадром (eng. Behind the Screen). Moscow: Цетрополиграф, 2000 (Autobiography).

References

External links

1934 births
2015 deaths
Soviet film directors
Soviet screenwriters
Male screenwriters
Mass media people from Tashkent
Burials in Troyekurovskoye Cemetery
Russian film directors
20th-century Russian screenwriters
20th-century Russian male writers